The geology of Hampshire in southern England broadly comprises a gently folded succession of sedimentary rocks dating from the Cretaceous and Palaeogene periods. The lower (early) Cretaceous rocks are sandstones and mudstones whilst those of the upper (late) Cretaceous  are the various formations which comprise the Chalk Group and give rise to the county's downlands. Overlying these rocks are the less consolidated Palaeogene clays, sands, gravels and silts  of the Lambeth, Thames and Bracklesham Groups which characterise the Hampshire Basin.

Hampshire Basin

In the south, along the coast, soft Eocene and Oligocene clays and gravels form low flat terrain, the Hampshire Basin. Protected from sea erosion by the Isle of Purbeck, Dorset, and the Isle of Wight, this land supports heathland and woodland habitats, a large area of which form part of the New Forest.

Much of the coastal landscape of the Hampshire Basin results from sea level rise in the Flandrian (after the last ice age) some 6000 years BP. There are several large estuaries and rias, notably the 12 mile long Southampton Water and the large convoluted Portsmouth Harbour. The Solent, which separates the Isle of Wight from the coast of Hampshire, is itself a flooded river valley, further erosion having broken the remaining chalk link with the mainland.

Chalk Downs
In the centre and north of the county the substrate is the chalk of the Hampshire Downs and the South Downs.  These are high hills with steep slopes where they border the clays to the south.  The downland supports a calcareous grassland habitat, important for wild flowers and insects, as well as arable agriculture.  The hills dip steeply forming a scarp onto the Kennet valley to the north, and dip gently to the south.  The highest point in the county is Pilot Hill, which reaches the height of 286m/938 ft. The rivers Test and Itchen flow from the downland through green valleys, both supporting trout and other wildlife.

A series of east-west trending folds in the chalk to the north of the Hampshire Basin is controlled by faults in the underlying Jurassic strata. From south to north these are the Winchester-East Meon Anticline, the Winchester-King's Somborne Syncline/Alderbury - Mottisfont Syncline, the Stockbridge Anticline and the Micheldever Syncline. The Winchester-East Meon Anticline in particular gives rise to many hills including Yew Hill, Compton Down, Oliver's Battery, Magdalen (Morn) Hill, Chilcomb Down, Cheesefoot Head, Telegraph Hill, Deacon Hill, Twyford Down, St. Catherine's Hill, Beacon Hill, Old Winchester Hill and Henwood Down.

Around the chalk margins to the north are the Pewsey-Kingsclere Anticline and to the south the Dean Hill Anticline, Portsdown Anticline, Forest of Bere Syncline and Chichester Syncline.

Further north, beyond the downs, the landscape is again lowland clay and gravel heathland, though the north is generally greener and more diverse than the south.

See also
 Geology of the United Kingdom
Geology of the New Forest
 List of hills of Hampshire

References

 Draper, Jo. 1990. Hampshire. Wimborne: Dovecote Press.